Christmas Time with the Judds is the fourth studio album by American country duo the Judds. It was released on September 29, 1987 in conjunction with Curb and RCA Nashville. It was produced by Brent Maher. Christmas Time was the duo's first collection of Christmas music released in a full-length album. The album contained nine tracks of holiday material that would later be re-released in the following decades.

Background and content
Christmas Time with the Judds would be the duo's fourth studio album and first of Christmas music. By this point, the duo had become one of country music's most successful duo's, having several number one hits and three successful studio albums.

Christmas Time was recorded at the Creative Workshop, located in Nashville, Tennessee. The record was produced by Brent Maher, whom had previously produced the Judds's previous three studio offerings. A total of nine tracks were included in the holiday package. Eight of the album's tracks were cover versions of well-known holiday tunes. Songs covered on the album included "Silver Bells," "Winter Wonderland," "Away in a Manger" and "O Holy Night." One new recording was offered as well. The third track, "Who Is This Babe," had not been recorded prior to the album's release. It was composed by Don Potter, who served as the duo's assistant producer on several projects.

Critical reception

Christmas Time with the Judds received mostly positive reviews following its release. Heather Phares of Allmusic gave the album 4.5 out of 5 stars. She praised the album's cover versions of Christmas tunes, calling them holiday favorites. In conclusion, she stated: "An enjoyable Christmas collection, and a must for fans of the Judds."

In 2018, the album was reviewed by the online publication, Nashville Noise. Writer Gabe Crawford gave the collection a positive response. Crawford called the album's remakes of holiday Christian tunes to be the record's highlights, praising "What Child Is This?" and "Beautiful Star of Bethlehem." Crawford also commented on the duo's harmony vocals, calling them "angelic." "In the rush of the Christmas season, Christmas Time With the Judds is a slow reflection and reminder of what Christmas is really about," he concluded. In addition, online publication Ultimate Twang gave the record a positive reception in their review. "The Judds made a lot of great music during the 80s, but this album may well be the epitome," writers commented.

Release and chart performance
Christmas Time with the Judds was first released on September 29, 1987, via Curb Records and RCA Records. In its original release, it was offered in several formats: a vinyl LP, audio cassette and compact disc. The album was re-released in 1999 via Curb and Mercury Records, offered as a compact disc.

In its original 1987 release, Christmas Time peaked at number 49 on the Billboard Top Country Albums chart. Then, the album re-charted the same survey in 1988 and reached number 68. The package also charted on the Billboard Top Holiday Albums list. In its original release, Christmas Time peaked at number nine on the holiday albums chart in December 1987. After its 1999 re-issue, it re-charted the same list, peaking at number 36 in January 2000. The album also spawned one single release: "Silver Bells." Upon its original release in November 1987, the single did not chart any Billboard publications. Ten years later, the single made its first appearance on the Hot Country Songs chart, peaking at number 68 in January 1998.

Track listing

Vinyl and cassette versions

Compact disc version

Personnel
All credits are adapted from the liner notes of Christmas Time with the Judds.

Musical personnel

 Eddie Bayers – drums
 Mark Casstevens – rhythm guitar
 Christ Church Choir – choir
 Sonny Garrish – steel guitar
 Naomi Judd – harmony vocals
 Wynonna Judd – lead vocals
 Middle Tennessee State University Campus School Children's Choir – children's choir
 Craig Nelson – bass
 Bobby Ogdin – piano
 Don Potter – guitar, rhythm guitar, hi-string guitar, autoharp, bandleader
 Cynthia Reynolds Wyatt – harp
 Gene Sisk – piano
 David Schnaufer – dulcimer
 Ricky Skaggs – fiddle
 Jack Williams – bass

Technical personnel
 Barnes and Company – album graphics
 Nancy Boone – choir director
 Landy & Joy Gardner – choir arrangement
 Mary Hamilton – art direction
 Farrell Morris – percussion
 Brent Maher – producer, engineering, mixing
 Glenn Meadows – mastering
 Jim McKell – engineering, mixing
 Mark Prior – photographer

Chart performance

Certifications

Release history

References

1987 Christmas albums
Albums produced by Brent Maher
Christmas albums by American artists
Curb Records albums
The Judds albums
RCA Records Christmas albums